Hethumuni Ananda Gunasena de Silva (born 15 October 1925, date of death unknown) was a Puisne Justice of the Supreme Court of Ceylon. He was the son of Puisne Justice Hethumuni Ayadoris de Silva, CMG.

De Silva is deceased. He was survived by his wife, Airanganee de Silva, who died in October 2002.

References

Citations

Bibliography

 

1925 births
Year of death missing
20th-century Sri Lankan people
Puisne Justices of the Supreme Court of Ceylon
Sinhalese judges